Principio Furnace and village is in Cecil County, Maryland, 4 miles (6.4 km) northeast of Havre de Grace, MD.

The Principio Iron Works were started here in 1719 by Joseph Farmer with British capital and an ironmaster, John England, who made it one of the most successful in the colonial ironworks by the 1740s, producing pig iron for sale in London. Thomas Russell, Jr., England's successor, produced cannonballs for the Continental Army during the Revolution.

The works were part of the (larger) Principio Company, whose other holdings included the Accokeek or Potomac Ironworks on the land of George Washington's father, Augustine Washington (north of Ferry Farm near Fredericksburg, Virginia). This works was developed by the ironmaster England originally as a source of iron ore. As early as 1726, it may have included a cold blast charcoal furnace. Accokeek/Potomac served as the headquarters of the Principio Company until it was closed sometime in the mid-1750s.

The Maryland works were burnt by British forces in 1813.
 
In 1836, the site and its ruined buildings were purchased by Joseph Whitaker, his brothers George Price Whitaker and Joseph Whitaker II, and partners Thomas Garrett (a prominent abolitionist) and William Chandler. The site still had water power; more importantly, it was crossed by the freshly laid tracks of the Philadelphia, Wilmington, and Baltimore Railroad. (Chandler was a director of the company.) The investors rebuilt the iron works and resumed production, opening a new blast furnace in 1837 and other improvements over the decades.

Before the Civil War, the Whitakers divided their holdings geographically, with Joseph receiving the Pennsylvania properties and George Price the Maryland and Virginia ones. George Price Whitaker and his descendants continued to be involved in the iron and steel business; their holdings became part of the Wheeling Steel Company in 1921, and eventually of Wheeling-Pittsburgh Steel.

The site produced iron until 1925. Part of the stone furnace still remains on the site. In 1972, Principio Furnace was listed on the National Register of Historic Places.

Gallery

References

Gordon, Robert B. 1996 American Iron 1607-1900. The Johns Hopkins University Press, Baltimore and London.
May, Earl Chapin 1945	Principio to Wheeling: 1715-1945 A Pageant of Iron and Steel. Harper & Brothers Publishers, New York and London.
Robbins, Michael 1972	'The Principio Company: Iron-Making in Colonial Maryland, 1720-1781'. Unpublished paper. George Washington University, Washington.
Robbins, Michael 1986	The Principio Company : iron-making in colonial Maryland, 1720-1781. Garland, New York 
Whitely, William G. 1887 'The Principio Company. A Historical Sketch of the First Iron-Works in Maryland'. The Pennsylvania Magazine of History and Biography XI:63-68, 190-198, 288-295. The Historical Society of Pennsylvania, Philadelphia.

External links

, including undated photo, at Maryland Historical Trust website

Industrial buildings and structures on the National Register of Historic Places in Maryland
Buildings and structures in Cecil County, Maryland
Ironworks and steel mills in Maryland
Historic American Buildings Survey in Maryland
1719 establishments in Maryland
National Register of Historic Places in Cecil County, Maryland
Whitaker iron family